Garak or Gorak may refer to:
 Garak, Hamadan, a village in Hamadan Province, Iran
 Garak, Kerman, a village in Kerman Province, Iran
 Garak, Khuzestan, a village in Khuzestan Province, Iran
 Gorak, Kohgiluyeh and Boyer-Ahmad, a village in Kohgiluyeh and Boyer-Ahmad Province, Iran
 Garak-e Bala, a village in Hormozgan Province, Iran
 Garak-e Pain, a village in Hormozgan Province, Iran